Mina de Oro Catholic School (colloquially MDOCS) is the Private Parochial Catholic School in the Philippines. It is located on Fr. Bernard Peters Street, Zone III, Socorro, Oriental Mindoro, Philippines and was established in August 1963.

History 
The Mina De Oro Catholic School of Zone III, Socorro, Oriental Mindoro traces its origin  from Mina De Oro Academy situated at Sitio, Pola Junction, at barangay, Catiningan, Pola, Oriental Mindoro It was housed only in the residence of Mr. Ireneo Vida, Sr, its founder and first administrator. The administration and management was under a Private Corporation headed by a Board of Directors. Among its stockholders were:  Ireneo Vida Sr.; Eusebio 
Villanueva; Eugenio Vidal; Faustino Lasac; Domingo Del Rosario; Mariano Luna and Vicente Ortega Sr,
During the outbreak of war in 1941, the management temporarily suspend its operation.   It was only in the late forties when it was re-opened and classes resumed in the building built on the lot owned by Faustino Lasac, who eventually became one of the stockholders.
In 1951, classes were held in temporary building along the national road opposite the school because of the devastating typhoon “WANDA”. There were then complete elementary and secondary courses.
In 1952, there were increased in enrollment which forced the management to build a new   building in the present site. It was under the administration of the late Eusebio Villanueva, Eugenia Vidal and Felipe Martinez who were the Director, Principal and treasurer, respectively. It was Mr. Eugenio Vidal who acted as the first principal of Mina De Oro Academy. The school survived and continued its operation until school year 1963–1964.
In the same year, the administration finally resorted to selling of Mina De Oro Academy due to financial instability. Monsignor William Duschak, SVD.  D.D., Apostolic Vicar of Calapan purchased the institution. It was converted into a Parochial Catholic Institution and renamed it Mina De Oro Catholic High School under the Directorship of Rev. Fr. Bernard Peters who at the same time was the Parish Priest of Socorro and Mrs., Angelita Aranas was the first   principal of Mina De Oro Catholic High School. Her term of office lasted, school year 1973.
In school year 2011, the Mina De Oro Catholic High School was again changed its name to Mina De Oro Catholic School due to school operation of Kindergarten,
As of today, the school remains as one of the Apostolic Vicariate of Calapan Parochial Schools   in the Diocese of Oriental Mindoro headed by Monsignor Warlito Cajandig. D.D, the chairman of the Board of Trustees.

Curriculum 

Educational institutions established in 1963
Schools in Oriental Mindoro
Catholic secondary schools in the Philippines
1963 establishments in the Philippines